In algebraic geometry, a closed immersion of schemes is a morphism of schemes  that identifies Z as a closed subset of X such that locally, regular functions on Z can be extended to X. The latter condition can be formalized by saying that  is surjective.

An example is the inclusion map  induced by the canonical map .

Other characterizations

The following are equivalent:

 is a closed immersion.
For every open affine , there exists an ideal  such that  as schemes over U.

Definition for locally ringed spaces 
In the case of locally ringed spaces a morphism  is a closed immersion if a similar list of criteria is satisfied

 The map  is a homeomorphism of  onto its image
 The associated sheaf map  is surjective with kernel 
 The kernel  is locally generated by sections as an -module

The only varying condition is the third. This implies for any open subscheme  containing  the sheaf has no sections. This violates the third condition since at least one open subscheme  covering  contains .

Properties

A closed immersion is finite and radicial (universally injective). In particular, a closed immersion is universally closed. A closed immersion is stable under base change and composition. The notion of a closed immersion is local in the sense that f is a closed immersion if and only if for some (equivalently every) open covering  the induced map  is a closed immersion.

If X is a separated S-scheme, then every S-section of X is a closed immersion.

A flat closed immersion of finite presentation is the open immersion of an open closed subscheme.

See also
Segre embedding
Regular embedding

Notes

References 

The Stacks Project

Morphisms of schemes